Full Nelson is a jazz album by Oliver Nelson recorded in 1962 and 1963, and released on Verve Records. It is one of his first big band albums. Nelson has also arranged his Hoe Down, originally based on an Aaron Copland composition, which initially appeared in a septet version on The Blues and the Abstract Truth, in a driving big band arrangement that features Clark Terry.

Reception
Down Beat magazine critic Harvey Pekar wrote that, "Nelson's alto work is featured on Full Nelson, Skokiaan, and Leonard Bernstein's Cool. He plays fluently and melodically with a somewhat harder tone than he has used in the past. Back Woods is a humorous piece, dedicated to Phil Woods and spotlighting his biting alto playing."

Track listing
All tracks composed by Oliver Nelson, unless otherwise noted.

"Full Nelson" – 2:47
"Skokiaan" (Msarurgwa, Glazer) - 1:54
"Miss Fine" - 4:11
"Majorca" - 3:06
"Cool" (Bernstein, Sondheim) - 4:55
"Back Woods" - 3:32
"Lila's Theme" (Goldsmith) - 3:55
"Ballad for Benny" - 2:36
"Hoe Down" - 2:50
"Paris Blues" (Ellington) - 2:57
"What Kind of Fool Am I?" (Newley, Bricusse) - 3:51
"You Love But Once" - 4:31

Personnel
Oliver Nelson - arranger, conductor, alto saxophone, tenor saxophone
George Duvivier (1, 2, 8, 9), Milt Hinton (all others) - bass
Phil Kraus - celesta, vibraphone (5, 6, 11, 12)
Ed Shaughnessy (1, 2, 8, 9), Osie Johnson (all others) - drums
Ray Alonge (1, 2, 8, 9), Bob Northern (1, 2, 8, 9) - French horn
Jimmy Raney (1, 2, 8, 9), Jim Hall (all others) - guitar
Harry Brewer - marimba, Castanets  (3, 4, 7, 10)
Al Cohn, Danny Bank, George Dorsey, Jerome Richardson, Gerry Dodgian [sic]  (1, 2, 8, 9), Phil Bodner (5, 6, 11, 12), Phil Woods, Romeo Penque (3, 4, 7, 10), Stan Webb - reeds
Paul Faulise, Willie Dennis, Rod Levitt (1, 2, 8, 9), Quentin Jackson, Urbie Green, Tony Stud (1, 2, 5, 6, 8, 9, 11, 12), Jimmy Cleveland (1, 2, 5, 6, 7, 8, 11, 12) - trombone
Clark Terry - trumpet, flugelhorn (1, 2, 3, 8, 9)
Bernie Glow, Ernie Royal, Snooky Young, Jimmy Maxwell (1, 2, 8, 9), Joe Newman - trumpet

References 

1963 albums
Oliver Nelson albums
Verve Records albums